Paul Wadham (31 March 1943 – 4 May 2006) was an Australian rules footballer in the Victorian Football League.

Debuting with the Collingwood Football Club in 1964, Wadham was a key position forward for the Magpies, standing at 196 cm tall. He played 21 games, booting 9 goals in his two seasons at the club before leaving to be a playing coach for the Kyabram Football Club in 1966.

He was recruited from Mortlake.

References

External links

1943 births
2006 deaths
Collingwood Football Club players
Mortlake Football Club players
Australian rules footballers from Victoria (Australia)
Kyabram Football Club players